The 2018 UEFA European Under-19 Championship (also known as UEFA Under-19 Euro 2018) was the 17th edition of the UEFA European Under-19 Championship (67th edition if the Under-18 and Junior eras are included), the annual international youth football championship organised by UEFA for the men's under-19 national teams of Europe. Finland hosted the final tournament, between 16 and 29 July, after being selected by UEFA on 26 January 2015. A total of eight teams competed in the tournament, with players born on or after 1 January 1999 eligible to participate.

Same as previous editions held in even-numbered years, the tournament acted as the UEFA qualifiers for the FIFA U-20 World Cup. The top five teams of the tournament qualified for the 2019 FIFA U-20 World Cup in Poland as the UEFA representatives, besides Poland who qualified automatically as hosts.

In the final, 2017 runners-up Portugal beat the 2016 losing finalists Italy 4–3, after extra-time, to win their first title in the under-19 era and their fourth overall. Having won the Under-17 title in 2016, this generation of players became the first to hold the European title in both youth categories. England were the defending champions, but were eliminated by France, finishing third in the group stage. They lost 0–3 to Norway in the play-off round and thus failed to qualify for the 2019 FIFA U-20 World Cup, where they would also defend their title.

Qualification

All 55 UEFA nations entered the competition (including Kosovo who entered for the first time), and with the hosts Finland qualifying automatically, the other 54 teams competed in the qualifying competition to determine the remaining seven spots in the final tournament. The qualifying competition consisted of two rounds: Qualifying round, which took place in autumn 2017, and Elite round, which took place in spring 2018.

Qualified teams
The following teams qualified for the final tournament.

Note: All appearance statistics include only U-19 era (since 2002).

Final draw
The final draw was held on 30 May 2018, 12:00 EEST (UTC+3), at the Vaasa City Hall in Vaasa, Finland. The eight teams were drawn into two groups of four teams. There was no seeding, except that hosts Finland were assigned to position A1 in the draw.

Venues
The tournament took place in Vaasa and Seinäjoki.

Match officials
A total of 6 referees, 8 assistant referees and 2 fourth officials were appointed for the final tournament.

Referees
 Manuel Schüttengruber
 Jonathan Lardot
 Bartosz Frankowski
 Andrew Dallas
 Juan Martínez Munuera
 Sandro Schärer

Assistant referees
 Damir Lazić
 Bojan Zobenica 
 Daniel Norgaard
 Aron Härsing
 Bryngeir Valdimarsson 
 Alexandru Cerei
 Joakim Nilsson
 Ian Bird

Fourth officials
 Ville Nevalainen
 Petri Viljanen

Squads

Each national team submitted a squad of 20 players (Regulations Article 39).

Group stage
The final tournament schedule was confirmed on 5 June 2018.

The group winners and runners-up advanced to the semi-finals and qualified for the 2019 FIFA U-20 World Cup. The third-placed teams entered the FIFA U-20 World Cup play-off.

Tiebreakers
In the group stage, teams were ranked according to points (3 points for a win, 1 point for a draw, 0 points for a loss), and if tied on points, the following tiebreaking criteria were applied, in the order given, to determine the rankings (Regulations Articles 16.01 and 16.02):
Points in head-to-head matches among tied teams;
Goal difference in head-to-head matches among tied teams;
Goals scored in head-to-head matches among tied teams;
If more than two teams were tied, and after applying all head-to-head criteria above, a subset of teams were still tied, all head-to-head criteria above were reapplied exclusively to this subset of teams;
Goal difference in all group matches;
Goals scored in all group matches;
Penalty shoot-out if only two teams had the same number of points, and they met in the last round of the group and were tied after applying all criteria above (not used if more than two teams had the same number of points, or if their rankings were not relevant for qualification for the next stage);
Disciplinary points (red card = 3 points, yellow card = 1 point, expulsion for two yellow cards in one match = 3 points);
UEFA coefficient for the qualifying round draw;
Drawing of lots.

All times were local, EEST (UTC+3).

Group A

Group B

Knockout stage
In the knockout stage, extra time and penalty shoot-out were used to decide the winner if necessary.

Bracket

FIFA U-20 World Cup play-off
Winner qualified for 2019 FIFA U-20 World Cup.

Semi-finals

Final

Qualified teams for FIFA U-20 World Cup
The following six teams from UEFA qualify for the 2019 FIFA U-20 World Cup, including Poland which qualified as hosts.

1 Bold indicates champions for that year. Italic indicates hosts for that year.

Goalscorers

Team of the Tournament
The UEFA technical observers selected the following 11 players for the team of the tournament (and an additional nine substitutes):

Starting XI:

Goalkeeper
 Alessandro Plizzari

Defenders
 Raoul Bellanova
 Romain Correia
 Davide Bettella
 Rúben Vinagre

Midfielders
 Michaël Cuisance
 Florentino Luís
 Sandro Tonali

Wingers
 Jota
 Moussa Diaby

Forward
 Vladyslav Supriaha

Substitutes:

Goalkeeper
 Yehvann Diouf

Outfield
 Thierry Correia
 Trevoh Chalobah
 Domingos Quina
 Saku Ylätupa
 Nicolò Zaniolo
 Serhiy Buletsa
 Francisco Trincão
 Moise Kean

References

External links

UEFA Under-19 history: 2017/18
2017/18 final tournament: Finland, UEFA.com

 
2018
Under-19 Championship
2018 Uefa European Under-19 Championship
2018 in Finnish football
2018 in youth association football
July 2018 sports events in Europe
2019 FIFA U-20 World Cup qualification